The  was a powerful noble clan of Baekje, one of the Three Kingdoms of Korea.

History
They were one of the "Great Eight Families" of Baekje: (Sa, Yeon, Hyeop, Hae, Jin, Guk, Mok, and Baek). This helped them gain high court positions in the government and military.

After the Battle at Mt. Amak fortress against Silla during the beginning of the reign of King Mu of Baekje the Great Eight Families lost a great deal of power. Among the families the Hae clan (who had led the battle), Hyeop, Jin and Mok disappeared from the central political stage leaving only the Yeon, Guk and Baek clans. The Sa clan promoted their influence by military force and produced a queen in the late reign of Mu of Baekje.

They did not lose their status as central nobles during the reign of the last King, Uija of Baekje by colluding with royal authority. The Buyeo clan (the royal family) acquired influence with the collapse of the Great Eight Families. After King Uija acceded the throne, royal might was also divided and the lineal descendant of the royal clan with the king as its center was in control of political situation. Among the Great Eight Families, Yeon and Baek clans fell behind and only clans of Sa and Guk maintained their status as central nobles. In the late Baekje all the Great Eight Families except for Sa and Guk clans lost their status as the central nobles and were degraded to local influence at last.

Known members
The records of the Guk clan are sparse and broken making it hard to create a family tree but can be viewed as a timeline.

 30th King: Mu of Baekje
 Guk Jimo (?–?): in February, 616, he was sent as a diplomat to the Sui Dynasty of China to coordinate a time for a military expedition to Goguryeo. Then Xi Lu, an official from the Department of State Affairs in Sui was sent to Baekje by Emperor Yang of Sui to discuss cooperative relations.

See also
 Great Eight Families
 Jin clan
 Hae clan
 Mok clan
 Yeon clan
 Sa clan
 Baek clan
 Baekje
 Baekje Government

References
  Content in this article was copied from Samguk Sagi Scroll 23 at the Shoki Wiki, which is licensed under the Creative Commons Attribution-Share Alike 3.0 (Unported) (CC-BY-SA 3.0) license.

Baekje people